The House That Jack Built is a 1967 National Film Board of Canada animated short based on the nursery rhyme "This Is the House That Jack Built." Jack is desperate to escape his nine-to-five life. Mirroring the fairy tale, he trades his car for a handful of beans.

References

External links
 

1967 films
National Film Board of Canada animated short films
Quebec films
Films based on nursery rhymes
1960s animated short films
1967 animated films
1960s English-language films
1960s Canadian films